Hylomyscus pamfi is a species of murid rodent in the genus Hylomyscus. It is native to southeastern Ghana, Togo, Benin, and southwestern Nigeria.

References

pamfi
Mammals described in 2010